The 1962 Campeonato Profesional was the 16th season of Colombia's top-flight football league. 13 teams competed against one another. Millonarios won the league for the eighth time in its history and third in a row, defending successfully the title won in the previous season.

Background
12 teams from the last tournament competed in this one, joined by Unión Magdalena who returned to the competition after a two-year absence. Millonarios won the championship for the eighth time. The runners-up were Santa Fe.

League system
Every team played four games against each other team, two at home and two away, for a total of 48 matches. Teams received two points for a win and one point for a draw. If two or more teams were tied on points, places were determined by goal difference. The team with the most points is the champion of the league.

Teams

Final standings

Results

First turn

Second turn

Top goalscorers

Source: RSSSF.com Colombia 1963

References

External links 
Dimayor Official Page

1963 in Colombian football
Colombia
Categoría Primera A seasons